The Agenzia delle Entrate, or the Italian Revenue Agency, is the Italian governmental agency that enforces the financial code of Italy and collects taxes and revenue.

Operations and history

The agency provides several online services for Italian and non-Italian taxpayers. Italy has several agreements with other tax authorities to prevent double taxation.

, Ernesto Maria Ruffini is the Director General.

Several central departments report to the head of the agency are responsible for internal audits, personnel and legal issues, organizational matters, etc. The operational area is organized according to the Italian regions: there is a regional head office in each of 19 of the 20 regions, in the autonomous region of Trentino-Alto Adige there is a head office in Trento and Bolzano. The regional directorates are responsible for the tax offices and other branch offices. The agency had around 32,000 employees in 2020.

Bilancio 2010 issue
Agenzia delle Entrate, in 2010, imposed a €10.6 million fine.

Real estate functions
From 1 December 2012, the Italian Revenue Agency has incorporated the Real Estate and Land Registry Agency (Agenzia del Territorio), as provided for in Article 23 quarter of Decree-Law number 95 of 2012.
Cadastral data is provided by the office, with the Territorial Agency, to individual persons only to obtain the cadastral data of properties from a website.

References

External links
 Sito dell'Agenzia delle Entrate
 Fiscooggi Rivista telematica dell'Agenzia delle Entrate
 
 L'Agenzia delle Entrate e il rapporto con i contribuenti, sul portale RAI Economia

Revenue services
Government agencies of Italy
Taxation in Italy
Law enforcement in Italy
2001 establishments in Italy